Nicholas Alexandrovich (– ) was tsesarevich—the heir apparent—of Imperial Russia from 2 March 1855 until his death in 1865.

Early life

Grand Duke Nicholas was born on  1843, in the Alexander Palace in Tsarskoye Selo south of central Saint Petersburg, during the reign of his grandfather, Emperor Nicholas I. Nicknamed "Nixa", he was the eldest son of the Tsesarevich Alexander Nikolaevich, eldest son of Emperor Nicholas I, and the Tsesarevna Maria Alexandrovna of Russia. In 1855, his paternal grandfather died, and his father succeeded to the throne as Emperor Alexander II.

Nicholas was extremely well-educated and intelligent. His paternal uncle Grand Duke Konstantin called him "the crown of perfection." His history teacher said, “If I succeeded in forming a student equal to Nikolai Alexandrovich once in ten years, I’d think I’d have fulfilled my duties."

Nicholas had a close relationship with his younger brother, Grand Duke Alexander. He called Alexander "Pug." On his deathbed, he told his father, “Papa, take care of Sasha, he is such an honest, good man."

Engagement

In the summer of 1864, Nicholas became engaged to Princess Dagmar of Denmark. She was the second daughter of King Christian IX of Denmark and Louise of Hesse-Kassel and was a younger sister of the Princess of Wales, later Queen Alexandra and wife of the heir-apparent to the British throne, Albert Edward, who reigned as Edward VII.

Nicholas was besotted with Dagmar after he saw a photograph of her. On 3 August 1863, he wrote to his mother: "I haven’t fallen in love with anyone for a long time. . . You may laugh but the main reason for this is Dagmar whom I fell in love with long ago without even seeing her. I think only about her.” He was tremendously happy after he proposed to Dagmar in her native Denmark: “How can I not be happy when my heart tells me I love her, love her dearly?. . . How can I describe her? Pretty, direct, intelligent, lively yet shy.” As he continued on his European tour, he wrote love letters to Dagmar every day.

Death
Until 1865, Nicholas was thought to have a strong constitution. During a tour in southern Europe, he contracted an ailment that was initially incorrectly diagnosed as rheumatism.  Nicholas's symptoms at that time included back pain and a stiff neck, as well as sensitivity to noise and light. He thought little of his ailments, however, and continued his tour in Italy.

His health rapidly worsened, and he was sent to Southern France, but this move brought him no improvement. It was eventually determined that he was suffering from cerebro-spinal meningitis, and it was speculated that this illness of his was caused by a previous accident in a wrestling match, in which Nicholas participated and was thrown down. In the spring of 1865, Nicholas continued to decline, and he died on 24 April 1865, at the Villa Bermond in Nice, France.

On his deathbed, Nicholas expressed the wish that his fiancée become the bride of his younger brother and future tsarevich, Alexander. He "raised his right hand and took Sasha's [Alexander's] hand... and seemed to be reaching for Princess Dagmar's with his left." In 1866, Alexander and Dagmar married. 

Nicholas's death at the early age of 21 thoroughly devastated his mother, who was said to have pored obsessively over all aspects of Nicholas's life. Empress Maria never recovered from his death.

In 1867, construction was begun on a chapel named in his honor (:fr:Chapelle du tsarévitch Nicolas Alexandrovitch) in Nice, on the exact place where Nicholas was said to have died, and in 1868, the chapel was inaugurated, with his brother Alexander and his wife, the re-christened Maria Feodorovna, in attendance.

Honours

Ancestry

Notes

References
 Zeepvat, Charlotte, Romanov Autumn, Sutton Publishing, 2000

1843 births
1865 deaths
House of Holstein-Gottorp-Romanov
Russian grand dukes
Heirs apparent who never acceded
Neurological disease deaths in France
Infectious disease deaths in France
Deaths from meningitis
19th-century people from the Russian Empire
Tsesarevichs of Russia
Recipients of the Order of the White Eagle (Russia)
Recipients of the Order of St. Anna, 1st class
Grand Crosses of the Order of Saint Stephen of Hungary
Grand Croix of the Légion d'honneur
Knights of the Golden Fleece of Spain
Children of Alexander II of Russia
Sons of emperors
Burials at Saints Peter and Paul Cathedral, Saint Petersburg